Frank E. Buttolph (born Frances Editha Buttles; 1844–1924) was an American collector known for initiating the Miss Frank E. Buttolph American Menu Collection, 1851-1930 at New York Public Library in 1899.

Frances E. Buttles graduated from Mansfield State Normal School in Mansfield, Pennsylvania, in 1866.

Miss Frank E. Buttolph American Menu Collection, 1851-1930 
In 1899, Buttolph offered to donate her private collection of American menus to the New York Public Library. The director of the library at the time, John Shaw Billings, agreed to house the collection. Buttolph remained a steadfast presence at the library, continuing to expand the collection until her death in 1924. By 1903, there were more than 10,000 menus in the collection. The assortment was divided into two classes. The first referring to service meals in restaurants, hotels, meals on steamships and dining cars, and in the homes of people. The second class contained menus of famous private and public dinners, including events by rulers, diplomats, highbrow weddings, and special meals served to distinguished men and women privately on ocean voyages. Among the collection is a dinner menu from a public café in Paris on Christmas Day, 1870, the ninety-ninth day of the siege. Included on that menu is soup titled "consomme d'Elephant" and one of the roasts "Le chat flanque de rats". Other menus include American-Indian dinners and even a menu for the two hundredth anniversary dinner of The Thirteen Club. Today, it is part of the New York Public Library Menu Collection. It is one of the largest menu collections in the world. The collection continues to grow and is currently curated by culinary librarian, Rebecca Federman.

References

External links 
 NYPL, The Menu Collection Research Guide
 An interview with Rebecca Federman on The NYPL Menu Collection

American collectors
1924 deaths
1844 births